Robert Spencer Long (June 1927 in Chicago – December 25, 2015 in San Francisco), was a professor of physical science and the tenth president of Shimer College.

Long was born on the north side of Chicago and graduated from Roger C. Sullivan High School in the Rogers Park neighborhood in 1945.  After serving three years in the United States Navy, he studied at the University of Chicago, where he obtained a BA in 1951, a master of science in 1955, and a Ph.D. in geochemistry in 1964.  He subsequently taught at Nasson College in Maine, New College of Florida, and at the University of Puerto Rico before becoming Dean at Roger Williams College.

Long assumed the position of President of Shimer College on June 3, 1970, shortly after previous president Milburn Akers was killed in  car accident.  He took control of a college with rapidly dropping enrolment and rising debt, problems which continued to worsen throughout his tenure.  Long increased gift income to $300,000 per year, but this was not sufficient to counteract the financial problems.
In November 1973, the Board of Trustees announced that Shimer would close at the end of the year.  Although an emergency fundraising campaign by faculty and students kept the college open, Long resigned at the end of 1973. He publicly stated that the college would be unable to survive.

Long later worked for 18 years at the National Academy of Sciences in Washington, DC. He spent his retirement years in San Francisco. He died at the age of 88 on December 25, 2015, surrounded by family.

Notes

See also
History of Shimer College

University of Chicago alumni
Nasson College faculty
New College of Florida faculty
Roger Williams University faculty
Presidents of Shimer College
1927 births
2015 deaths